This is a list of recipients of the Governor General's Award for French-language poetry. The award was created in 1981 when the Governor General's Award for French language poetry or drama was divided.

Winners and nominees

1980s

1990s

2000s

2010s

2020s

References

French
Canadian poetry awards
Awards established in 1981
1981 establishments in Canada
Poetry
French-language literary awards